The Houston Astros' 1990 season was a season in American baseball. It involved the Houston Astros attempting to win the National League West.

Offseason
 December 6, 1989: Bill Gullickson was signed as a free agent by the Astros.
 December 19, 1989: Dan Schatzeder was signed as a free agent by the Astros.
 March 13, 1990: Dave Silvestri and a player to be named later were traded by the Astros to the New York Yankees for Orlando Miller. The Astros completed the deal by sending Daven Bond (minors) to the Yankees on June 11.

Regular season

Season standings

Record vs. opponents

Notable transactions
 April 3, 1990: Roger Mason was released by the Houston Astros.
 August 30, 1990: Larry Andersen was traded by the Astros to the Boston Red Sox for Jeff Bagwell.
 August 30, 1990: Bill Doran was traded by the Houston Astros to the Cincinnati Reds for players to be named later.
 September 10, 1990: Dan Schatzeder was traded by the Astros to the New York Mets for Nick Davis (minors) and Steve LaRose (minors).
 September 7, 1990: Butch Henry was sent by the Cincinnati Reds to the Houston Astros to complete an earlier deal made on August 30, 1990. Catcher Terry McGriff was also sent by the Cincinnati Reds to complete the deal.

Roster

Game log

Regular season

|-

|-

|-

|- style="text-align:center; background:#bbcaff;"
| colspan="12" | 61st All-Star Game in Chicago, Illinois
|-

|-

|-

|-

|- style="text-align:center;"
| Legend:       = Win       = Loss       = PostponementBold = Astros team member

Player stats

Batting

Starters by position
Note: Pos = Position; G = Games played; AB = At bats; H = Hits; Avg. = Batting average; HR = Home runs; RBI = Runs batted in

Other batters
Note: G = Games played; AB = At bats; H = Hits; Avg. = Batting average; HR = Home runs; RBI = Runs batted in

Pitching

Starting pitchers 
Note: G = Games pitched; IP = Innings pitched; W = Wins; L = Losses; ERA = Earned run average; SO = Strikeouts

Other pitchers 
Note: G = Games pitched; IP = Innings pitched; W = Wins; L = Losses; ERA = Earned run average; SO = Strikeouts

Relief pitchers 
Note: G = Games pitched; W = Wins; L = Losses; SV = Saves; ERA = Earned run average; SO = Strikeouts

Farm system

References

External links
1990 Houston Astros season at Baseball Reference

Houston Astros seasons
Houston Astros season
Houston